Jacques, Hereditary Prince of Monaco, Marquis of Baux (Jacques Honoré Rainier Grimaldi; born 10 December 2014), is the heir apparent to the Monegasque throne. He is the son of Prince Albert II and Princess Charlene, and twin brother of Princess Gabriella.
He also holds the title of Marquis of Baux, which all the heirs apparent to the crown of Monaco have held since 1643.

Birth 

On 30 May 2014, it was announced that Princess Charlene was pregnant. After much speculation it was confirmed, on 9 October 2014, that the couple was expecting twins by the end of the year. 

On 21 November 2014, the palace announced that each twin would have the right to a salvo of 21 cannon shots at birth. In addition, the day would be declared a holiday. On 10 December 2014, Jacques was born at Monaco's Princess Grace Hospital Centre, two minutes after his sister Gabriella.

The Prince's Palace of Monaco released a statement describing how the birth was to be celebrated in the principality. 42 cannon shots (21 for each child) were to be fired from the Fort Antoine and church bells were to ring for fifteen minutes, followed by boat horns. The twins were presented on 7 January 2015 which was declared a public holiday in Monaco.

Prince Jacques and Princess Gabriella have an older half-sister, Jazmin Grace Grimaldi, and an older half-brother, Alexandre Grimaldi-Coste, from their father's previous romances.

Baptism 
The newborn prince was baptised Jacques Honoré Rainier. Princess Charlene revealed that she chose the name Jacques, a name that is common in her homeland. The names Honoré and Rainier are common among previous rulers of Monaco. He received the title Marquis of Baux from his father.

The twins were baptised at the Cathedral of the Immaculate Conception on 10 May 2015.
At this occasion, he was awarded the Grand Cross of the Order of Grimaldi. A certified copy of this legal document is safeguarded in the Monaco cathedral, while another is at Bank of Monaco—Credit Suisse.

Titles and honors

 :
 Knight Grand Cross of the Order of Grimaldi (10 May 2015).

When referring to Jacques in French, the palace has used the term Prince Héréditaire to refer to the prince. However, when mentioning the prince in English, the palace has referred to Jacques as "Crown Prince" instead of "Hereditary Prince."

See also 
 List of current heirs apparent

References

|-

|-

|-

2014 births
Living people
Heirs apparent
Hereditary Princes of Monaco
House of Grimaldi
Marquesses of Baux
Monegasque people of American descent
Monegasque people of German descent
Knights Grand Cross of the Order of Grimaldi
Monegasque princes
People of Ligurian descent
Royal children
Monagesque twins
Sons of monarchs